Soga is a village and a ward in the Pwani Region of Tanzania. It is located in Kibaha District. 

According to the 2012 census, the population of Soga is 4,713.

Transport
Soga is one of the stops on the Central Line railway from Dar es Salaam to Kigoma. There will also be a train station in Soga on the first section of the new electric Tanzania Standard Gauge Railway from Dar es Salaam to Morogoro, which is scheduled to start operations in December 2019.

References

Populated places in Pwani Region